Dent is an unincorporated community in Clearwater County, Idaho.

History
A post office called Dent was established in 1896, and remained in operation until 1954. One Mr. Dent, an early postmaster, gave the community his last name.

References

Unincorporated communities in Clearwater County, Idaho
Unincorporated communities in Idaho